Nilo da Silva (born 24 November 1932) is a Brazilian modern pentathlete. He competed at the 1956 Summer Olympics.

References

1932 births
Living people
Brazilian male modern pentathletes
Olympic modern pentathletes of Brazil
Modern pentathletes at the 1956 Summer Olympics
Pan American Games silver medalists for Brazil
Pan American Games medalists in modern pentathlon
Modern pentathletes at the 1963 Pan American Games
Medalists at the 1963 Pan American Games
20th-century Brazilian people